The Honda HSC (Honda Sports Concept) is a concept sports car that was initially unveiled at the 2003 Tokyo Motor Show. Most of the automotive media immediately speculated that it was designed to be a replacement for the Honda NSX, although this was never confirmed by Honda. It was also branded as an Acura.

The HSC featured a lightweight, mid-mounted aluminum  i-VTEC V6 engine with a 6-speed transmission controlled by either an F1-style paddle shifter on the steering wheel or a unique dial shifter on the center console. When shifted into reverse, the navigation system's adjustable flat-panel screen in the center console becomes a display for a rear-mounted camera. Abundant leather and aluminum trim pieces round out the interior, an all-aluminum frame with carbon fibre body panels keep it light, and swan doors affirm its sports car status.

The development of this car into a production sports car appeared to stall for two years. However, the July 2005 announcement by Honda CEO Takeo Fukui indicated the HSC was only a test concept for a pure sports car.

In 2009, a road car version of the Honda HSV-010 GT was seen, with some visual similarities with the HSC. It was also assumed to be a replacement to the NSX, although there is no official confirmation of this. In 2013, Honda unveiled the next generation NSX concept car, that replaced the HSV-010 in the Super GT GT500 class.

References

External links
Honda HSC: The Nearly-NSX

HSC